Stephen W. Salant (born c. 1945) is an economist who has done extensive research in applied microeconomics (mostly in the fields of natural resources and industrial organization). His 1975 model of speculative attacks in the gold market (with Dale Henderson) was adapted by Paul Krugman and others to explain speculative attacks in foreign exchange markets. Hundreds of journal articles and books on financial speculative attacks followed.

In a series of six articles, Salant has continued to focus instead on real speculative attacks. These may be divided into two categories: (1) speculative attacks induced by government policies such as total allowable catch quotas in fisheries, H1-B immigration quotas, commodity price ceilings, and most recently the proposed price-collars on tradable emissions permits; and (2) speculative attacks that are naturally occurring rather than induced by government policy such as the precipitous depletions of storable common properties (e.g. “oil rushes”).

In industrial organization, he has contributed to the literatures on horizontal mergers, price discrimination, durable goods monopoly, and cartels.

Salant also has a long-standing interest in the Alger Hiss case and has published in that area as well.

He earned his B.A. in mathematics at Columbia University in 1967, and his Ph.D. in economics at the University of Pennsylvania in 1973. He worked at the Federal Reserve Board and the Rand Corporation, where he coedited The RAND Journal of Economics. Currently, Dr. Salant is professor of economics at the University of Michigan and a nonresident fellow at Resources for the Future.

Publications 
Besides his work on speculative attacks (see References), his papers include the following:

 "Exhaustible Resources and Industrial Structure: A Nash-Cournot Approach to the World Oil Market," Journal of Political Economy, October 1976.
 "Search Theory and Duration Data: A Theory of Sorts," Quarterly Journal of Economics, November 1976---anthologized in the International Library of Critical Writings volume entitled The Economics of Unemployment edited by P.N. Junakar, The International Library of Critical Writings in Economics, 2000.
 "Analytical Underpinnings of a Computerized World Oil Model," Operations Research, Spring 1982.
 "Losses from Merger: The Effects of an Exogenous Change in Industry Structure on Cournot-Nash Equilibrium" (with R. Reynolds and S. Switzer), Quarterly Journal of Economics, May 1983—reprinted in Cournot Oligopoly: Characterization and Applications, edited by Andrew Daughety, Cambridge University Press, 1988.
 "A Misguided Energy Program: Reshaping OECD's Oil-Sharing Plan" (with R. Smith), New York Times, Sunday Forum, November 4, 1984. Supporting editorial appeared in New York Times, November 16, 1984.
 "Cartels that Vote: Agricultural Marketing Boards and Induced Voting Behavior" (with J. Cave), Public Regulation: New Perspectives on Institutions and Policies, edited by Elizabeth Bailey, and published by MIT Press, 1987.
 "Ending the Hidden Subsidy to South Africa," Newsday, July 10, 1987 (reprinted in the Ann Arbor News, August 5, 1987).
 "The Positive and Normative Consequences of Treble Damage Awards in Private Lawsuits for Price Fixing," Journal of Political Economy, December 1987.
 "When is Inducing Self-Selection Suboptimal for a Monopolist?" Quarterly Journal of Economics, May 1989.
 "Durable-Goods Monopoly with Discrete Demand" (with M. Bagnoli and J. Swierzbinski), Journal of Political Economy, December 1989.
 "Predicting Committee Behavior in Majority-Rule Experiments" (with E. Goodstein), Rand Journal, Summer 1990.
 "Existence and Uniqueness of Cournot Equilibrium: New Results from Old Methods" (with G. Gaudet), Review of Economic Studies, April 1991.
 "Increasing the Profits of a Subset of Firms in Oligopoly Models with Strategic Substitutes" (with G. Gaudet), American Economic Review, June 1991.
 "When to Use a Broker and How to Price the House" Journal of Real Estate Finance and Economics, June 1991.
 "Intertemporal Self-Selection with Multiple Buyers under Complete Information" (with M. Bagnoli and J. Swierzbinski), Economic Theory, vol 5, 1995.
 "Deducing Implications of Fitness Maximization When a Tradeoff Exists Among Alternative Currencies" (with K. Kalat and A. Wheatcroft), Behavioral Ecology, vol. 6, no. 4, winter 1995.
 "Cartel Quotas under Majority Rule" (with J. Cave), American Economic Review, March 1995. Reprinted in Agricultural Markets: Mechanisms, Failures and Regulations edited by David Martimort, North Holland (July 1996).
 "Game Theory and the Law: Is Game Theory Ready for Prime Time?" (coauthored with T. Sims), Michigan Law Review, May 1996.
 "Optimal Asymmetric Strategies in Research Joint Ventures" (with G. Shaffer), International Journal of Industrial Organization,
March 1998.
 "When is the Standard Analysis of Common Property Extraction under Free Access Correct?---A Game-Theoretic Justification for Non Game-Theoretic Analyses" (with R. Brooks, M. Murray, and J. Cotroneo), Journal of Political Economy, August 1999.
 "Unequal Treatment of Identical Agents in Cournot Equilibrium: Private and Social Advantages" (with G. Shaffer), American Economic Review, June 1999.
 "Intertemporal Depletion of Resource Sites by Spatially Distributed Users" (with G. Gaudet and M. Moreaux),  American Economic Review, September 2001.
 "Spatially and Intertemporally Efficient Solid Waste Management," (with E. Ley and M. Macauley),  Journal of Environmental Economics and Management, March, 2002.
 "The Economics of Mutualisms: Optimal Utilization of Mycorrhizal Mutualistic Partners by Plants"  (with Miroslav Kümmel), Ecology, April 2006
 "The Benefits of Expediting Government Gold Sales: Simulation Results" (with Dale Henderson, John Irons, and Sebastian Thomas), Review of Financial Economics, forthcoming
 "Cartels" (two volumes), coedited with Margaret Levenstein, Edward Elgar
 "Putting Free Riding to Work: a Partnership Solution to the Common Property Problem (with Martin Heintzelman and Stephan Schott), Journal of Environmental Economics and Management, May, 2009
 "The Welfare Cost of Unreliable Water Service” (with Brian Baisa, Lucas Davis, and William Wilcox), Journal of Development Economics, May 2010
  "Successful Strategic Deception: A Case Study," July, 2010.
"Willpower and the Optimal Control of Visceral Urges” (with Emre Ozdenoren and Dan Silverman), forthcoming in  Journal of the European Economic Association

References

External links

21st-century American economists
Columbia College (New York) alumni
University of Pennsylvania alumni
University of Michigan faculty
1940s births
Living people